Forrest's Cavalry Corps was part of the Confederate States Army during the American Civil War and commanded by Lieutenant General Nathan Bedford Forrest. Formed during the summer of 1862, it took part in the various battles in the Western Theater during the second half of the war. At first serving as part of the Army of Tennessee, both Forrest and the corps were then transferred to northern Mississippi and often launched independent raids into Union occupied western and central Tennessee.

History

1863
In May 1863, Nathan Bedford Forrest was given the cavalry command of Earl Van Dorn, who had recently been murdered. The corps initially consisted of the divisions of William H. Jackson and Frank C. Armstrong but Jackson's division was soon sent to Mississippi, leaving Forrest with only Armstrong's division. On September 3, Braxton Bragg, commander of the Army of Tennessee, gave Forrest the division of John Pegram and placed him in command of all the cavalry north of Chattanooga. During the early stages of the Chickamauga Campaign, Forrest's corps served on the army's right as a rear guard during the retreat from Chattanooga, while Forrest himself was wounded during the fighting. The corps covered the right flank of D. H. Hill's corps during the Battle of Chickamauga, earning praise from Hill. On the morning of September 21, following the Confederate victory in the battle, Forrest rode towards Chattanooga with four hundred men and found that the Union army was still in chaos; he urged Bragg to attack the city immediately but Bragg instead settled in for a siege of the Union garrison.

During the early stages of the Chattanooga Campaign, Bragg ordered Forrest to transfer the majority of his corps to Joseph Wheeler's cavalry corps, which was about to raid the Union supply lines into Chattanooga. Much has been made of Forrest threatening Bragg, the famous story comes from John Wyeth’s 1899 biography: The Life of General Nathan Forrest. The official records seem to show a respectful relationship between Bragg and Forrest. The original source was James Cowan, a surgeon in the Confederate army and Forrest’s cousin who was the only actual eyewitness. However, Cowan’s  recounting suggests that Jefferson Davis was also there, which is not possible. In Wyeth’s second edition, he removed this story.

Whatever actually happened, Bragg transferred three of Forrest’s brigades into Wheeler’s Corps, but not Forrest himself. Forrest had asked to be transferred back to West TN in late August, with a battery, his escort and a battalion of Cavalry, which is exactly what Bragg did, so no reason to even confront him.

The local Union commanders attempted to surround the Confederates in Jackson but Forrest managed to retreat back to Mississippi at the end of December. Once in Holly Springs, he organized his recruits into a cavalry corps with two divisions commanded by James R. Chalmers and Abraham Buford. Forrest was promoted to Major-General but Chalmers did not want to serve under him and threatened to leave his command. Chalmers was convinced to remain with Forrest.

1864
The first test of his new cavalry corps began with General Sherman's Meridian Expedition that culminated in the Battle of Meridian.  While Sherman moved 20,000 infantry from Vicksburg, General William Sooy Smith was to lead a large force of Union cavalry from Collierville, TN, and meet him at Meridian while destroying the railroad and the crops in the rich prairie. General Forrest moved his cavalry into position and struck the Union cavalry from three directions at Battle of Okolona on February 22. This was a minor victory but it was good practice for more raids out of Memphis by Union cavalry.  On March 16, Forrest launched another raid into western Tennessee to capture Union supplies for his corps and to allow his Kentucky and Tennessee troops to return home.  Forrest established his headquarters at Jackson and from there, he moved his brigades to attack Union installations: Union City, TN, on March 24; Battle of Paducah (Fort Anderson), Kentucky, on March 24; and Battle of Fort Pillow (also known as the Fort Pillow massacre) on April 12, which ended with a massacre of African-American Union troops and their white officers attempting to surrender.  On May 2, his corps began their return into central Mississippi.

In June Union general Samuel D. Sturgis led an expedition into northern Mississippi to keep Forrest from raiding Union supply lines during the Atlanta Campaign. On June 10, Forrest attacked Sturgis in the Battle of Brice's Crossroads and routed the Union force. Despite losing nearly 500 men, he inflicted over 2,200 casualties and captured 16 cannons, 176 wagons, and 1,500 small arms. Following Forrest's victory, several in the Western Theater, including Joseph E. Johnston and Georgia Governor Joseph E. Brown, urged that Forrest's corps be used to raid William T. Sherman's supply lines; Davis turned down the requests.

In late June, Union Major General Andrew J. Smith launched another expedition into Mississippi to tie down the Confederate forces in the region. Forrest united with an infantry force commanded by Stephen Lee and attacked the Union forces near Harrisburg, Mississippi, on July 14; uncoordinated Confederate attacks on the Union right wing resulted in a Union victory. Only 3,500 of Forrest's and Lee's 7,000 men joined in the attack and 1,300 became casualties; Smith lost only 674 men. Despite his victory, Smith retreated from the field towards Tupelo, where Forrest attacked again the next day and was again defeated. During the battle, Forrest was wounded in the right thigh and was forced to turn command over to Chalmers.

In mid-September, Forrest launched a raid into northern Alabama and central Tennessee to disrupt Sherman's supply lines, returning to northern Mississippi in early October. Although he was able to capture nearly 2,400 Union soldiers and many supplies, Sherman captured Atlanta in early September, before Forrest had started his raid. Despite this failure, Forrest launched another raid in mid-October, in another attempt to cut the Union supply lines to Atlanta and force Sherman to abandon the city. After arriving in western Tennessee, he was forced to disperse many of his men so they could obtain fresh mounts. With less than 3,000 men, Forrest set up artillery positions along the Tennessee River which forced the surrender of several supply ships and the gunboat Undine. On the evening of November 3, 1864, Forrest's artillerist, Capt. John Morton, positioned his guns across the river from the Federal supply base at Johnsonville. On the morning of November 4, Undine and the Confederate batteries were attacked by three Union gunboats from Johnsonville under U.S. Navy Lt. Edward M. King and by the six Paducah gunboats under Lt. Cmdr. LeRoy Fitch. Capt. Frank M. Gracey (a former steamboat captain now serving as a Confederate cavalryman) abandoned Undine, setting her on fire, which caused her ammunition magazine to explode, ending Forrest's brief career as a naval commander. Despite this loss, the Confederate land artillery was completely effective in neutralizing the threat of the Federal fleets. Fitch was reluctant to take his Paducah gunboats through the narrow channel between Reynoldsburg Island and the western bank, so limited himself to long-range fire. King withered under the Confederate fire, which hit one of his vessels 19 times, and returned to Johnsonville.

Capt. Morton's guns bombarded the Union supply depot and the 28 steamboats and barges positioned at the wharf. All three of the Union gunboats—Key West, Tawah, and Elfin—were disabled or destroyed.[7] The Union garrison commander ordered that the supply vessels be burned to prevent their capture by the Confederates. Forrest observed, "By night the wharf for nearly one mile up and down the river presented one solid sheet of flame. ... Having completed the work designed for the expedition, I moved my command six miles during the night by the light of the enemy's burning property. Forrest caused enormous damage at very low cost. He reported only 2 men killed and 9 wounded. He described the Union losses as 4 gunboats, 14 transports, 20 barges, 26 pieces of artillery, $6,700,000 worth of property, and 150 prisoners. One Union officer described the monetary loss as about $2,200,000.

At this time, Forrest was ordered to move into northern Alabama to unite with the Army of Tennessee, now commanded by John B. Hood. Hood was launching an invasion of central Tennessee and wanted Forrest's corps to replace the cavalry corps of Joseph Wheeler, who was on detached duty in Georgia. Due to poor roads and swollen rivers, Forrest was unable to reach Hood's army until November 18; many of his men were still in western Tennessee trying to find mounts and Forrest had only 6,000 men at that point. Once united with the army, the division of William H. Jackson was attached to Forrest's corps. At Spring Hill, Forrest was ordered to seize the town and cut off the Union line of retreat but the Union garrison was stronger than Hood had anticipated. By the time the Confederate infantry had arrived, the rest of the Union army had also arrived and stalled the Confederate attacks. During the night, Forrest attempted to cut the Columbia-to-Franklin turnpike but the Union army repulsed that attack as well, while Forrest was unable to counterattack due to a shortage of ammunition. The next morning, Forrest served as the advance guard during the march to Franklin, where his corps was deployed on the Confederate flanks during the following battle (Chalmer's division on the far left flank, Buford's division on the right flank along the western bank of the Harpeth River, and Jackson's division on the eastern bank of the river). During the Confederate attack, Buford's division failed to reach the Union line due to heavy defensive artillery and rifle fire; Chalmer's division attacked at about 5 p.m. but Chalmers felt that the Union position was too strong for a full-scale attack. Following the Union retreat to Nashville, Hood detached Forrest's corps to make raids on the Union posts in central Tennessee; Forrest was able to capture several blockhouses and destroyed several miles of tracks. Convinced that the town of Murfreesboro was the key to the capture of Nashville, Hood ordered Forrest to take two of his cavalry divisions and William Bate's infantry division and capture the Union post there. Forrest's attack on December 7 failed, with a loss of over 200 prisoners and several cannons. Bate's division was returned to Nashville the next day and Forrest was ordered to patrol the area between Nashville and Murfreesboro. After the Confederate defeat in the Battle of Nashville, Forrest commanded the rear guard composed of his cavalry and eight infantry brigades of his own choosing. Forrest's men fought several skirmishes which helped slow down the Union pursuit.

1865
After the campaign ended, Forrest regrouped his corps in northern Mississippi, where he attempted to replenish his equipment and recruit additional men, even offering a twenty-day furlough to any man who brought in a new recruit. In January, Richard Taylor named Forrest commander of all cavalry units in the Department of Alabama, Mississippi, and East Louisiana; Forrest reorganized his forces into four divisions split along state lines, commanded by Chalmers, Buford, Jackson, and Tyree Bell. Union diversions staged throughout the early months of 1865 forced Forrest to disperse his men across a wide region. In late March, Union Major General James H. Wilson started a massive raid through Alabama, with the intention of destroying Confederate industrial centers, especially the factories located at Selma, Alabama. Forrest attempted to delay Wilson near Plantersville on April 1 in order to gain time for his scattered force to concentrate but Wilson overran the Confederate positions, taking 300 prisoners and forcing Forrest to retreat into the defenses of Selma. Once in Selma, Forrest attempted to gather every man capable of fighting, including the local home guard and militia, into the city's defenses works but he had too few troops to adequately man the works. Wilson launched an attack in the late afternoon of April 2 and quickly overran the defenses, capturing 2,700 men and thirty cannons while losing only 350 men himself. Over the next few weeks, Forrest attempted to gather and reorganize his corps; when he received word that Taylor had surrendered his department, Forrest formally surrendered his command on May 9.

See also
Cavalry Corps (Union Army)
Cavalry Corps, Army of Northern Virginia

Notes

References
 Cozzens, Peter. This Terrible Sound: The Battle of Chickamauga. Chicago, Illinois: University of Illinois Press, 1992. .
 Hurst, Jack. Nathan Bedford Forrest: A Biography. New York: Alfred A. Knopf, 1993. 
 Jordan, Thomas and J. P. Pryor, The campaigns of Lieut.-Gen. N.B. Forrest, and of Forrest's cavalry. Blelock & Co., 1868.
 Sword, Wiley. The Confederacy's Last Hurrah: Spring Hill, Franklin, & Nashville. Lawrence, Kansas: University Press of Kansas, 1992. .
 Trudeau, Noah Andre. Out of the Storm: The End of the Civil War, April–June 1865. New York: Little, Brown and Company, 1994. .
 Wills, Brian Steel. A Battle from the Start: The Life of Nathan Bedford Forrest. New York: HarperCollins, 1992. .

1863 establishments in Tennessee
Corps of the Confederate States Army
Military units and formations established in 1863
Military units and formations disestablished in 1865
Cavalry Corps